Bennington is a surname. People with the surname include:

Billy Bennington (1900–1986), English musician
Chester Bennington (1976–2017), lead singer of rock bands Linkin Park and Dead by Sunrise
Christina Bennington (born 1992), Northern Irish actress and singer
Elisabeth Bennington (born 1976), American politician
Geoffrey Bennington (born 1956), Professor of French and Professor of Comparative Literature at Emory University
Jimmy Bennington (born 1970), American musician
Ron Bennington (born 1958), co-host of the Ron and Fez radio show
Seddon Bennington (1947–2009), New Zealand museum executive